St. Michael's Secondary School is a dual session secondary school located in the city of Sandakan, state of Sabah, East Malaysia. It is located at the foot of Elton Hill which is at the hub of the city on the Churches Road. The school was established on 5 October 1888, making it one of the oldest schools in Sandakan.

History
St. Michael's Secondary School is a part of the Anglican Diocese of Sabah. The development of Anglican Church schools was inspired by foreign settlers to provide education to their children.

St. Michael's was founded in 1888 by the late Rev. William Henry Elton. At first, there were two students in the school, who taught  Elton Malay language and Chinese language. In exchange, Elton taught them English.

After World War II St. Michael's collapsed, but the school was rebuilt using donations from people around the district.

St. Michael's is divided into two sections. The new building consists of five floors including washroom, staffroom, science laboratories, IT lab, library and classrooms. The other part of the school includes classrooms, Canteen A and surau (a small place of worship for Muslims). Canteen B is located in front of the Canteen A. Between the two buildings, there is an open place for outdoor activities. In addition, there is Elton Square on the ground floor of the new building.

Principals

Facilities and buildings

Elton Square
Located on the crest of Elton Hill, next to the World's Heritage, is St. Michael and All Angels' Church, the oldest stone structure in Sabah. It has two academic buildings, a cafeteria, and a multi-purpose court.
Legacy Block is a 2-storey wooden building with classrooms, a hall, a cooperation store and a utility room.
Another academic building is a 6-storey concrete building leaning on the crest of Elton Hill. It consists of five laboratories, the staff office, the principal's office, a library, an auditorium, a skill training workshop, a kitchen workshop, an art centre, a dental clinic, a book storage room, and a sport equipment storage room.

Other features
 The Botanical Garden was created by the "Environment Lovers' Club", has been demolished to secure the Legacy Block.
 The Heliconia Garden is a row of flowers planted by the "Environment Lovers' Club" as part of the Elton Hill's beautification project.
 Michaelean Court is the newest feature of the school for students recess time and will host the new canteen.
 The Parish Hall is an activity hall lent by the church for school events such as the Graduation Ceremony.

See also
 St. Michael's Secondary School (Penampang), Sabah, Malaysia (1890)
 St. Michael's Institution, Ipoh, Perak, Malaysia (1912)

References

Secondary schools in Malaysia
Schools in Sabah
Educational institutions established in 1888
Anglican schools in Malaysia
1888 establishments in North Borneo